The Journal of the Experimental Analysis of Behavior is a peer-reviewed academic journal of psychology that was established in 1958 by B.F. Skinner and Charles Ferster. JEAB publishes empirical research related to the experimental analysis of behavior and is published by Wiley-Blackwell on behalf of the Society for the Experimental Analysis of Behavior.The current editor-in-chief is Mark Galizio (University of North Carolina, Wilmington). The 2021 impact factor is 2.215.

The mission of the Journal of the Experimental Analysis of Behavior (JEAB) is "the original publication of experiments relevant to the behavior of individual organisms."

See also
Journal of Applied Behavior Analysis (JABA)
Behavior Modification (journal)
Society for the Experimental Analysis of Behavior

References

External links

Behaviorism journals
Wiley-Blackwell academic journals
English-language journals
Publications established in 1958
Experimental psychology journals